Uspensky (masculine), Uspenskaya (feminine), or Uspenskoye (neuter) is the name of several rural localities in Russia:
Uspensky, Bryansk Oblast, a settlement in Bryansky District of Bryansk Oblast
Uspensky, name of several other rural localities
Uspenskaya (rural locality), a stanitsa in Beloglinsky District of Krasnodar Krai
Uspenskoye, Kaduysky District, Vologda Oblast, a selo in Semizerye Rural Settlement, Kaduysky District, Vologda Oblast
Uspenskoye, Krasnodar Krai, a selo in Uspensky District of Krasnodar Krai
Uspenskoye, Voronezh Oblast, a selo in Korotoyakskoye Rural Settlement, Ostrogozhsky District, Voronezh Oblast
Uspenskoye, name of several other rural localities